North-East Frontier Railway Stadium is a multi-purpose stadium at Maligaon in Guwahati, Assam. It is mainly used for organizing matches of football and cricket. The stadium has hosted 33 first-class matches  in 1976 when Assam cricket team played against Orissa cricket team. The ground hosted 32 more first-class matches from 1978 to 2009. The stadium also hosted 18 List A matches when Central Zone cricket team played against North Zone cricket team but since then the stadium has hosted non-first-class matches.

References

External links
 Cricketarchive
 Cricinfo

Sports venues in Assam
Cricket grounds in Assam
Sports venues completed in 1976
1976 establishments in Assam
20th-century architecture in India